Holy Trinity is a 2019 American comedy film written, produced, directed by, and starring Molly Hewitt in their feature directorial debut. Hewitt plays Trinity, a dominatrix who, after huffing from a mysterious aerosol can, discovers that she has the ability to communicate with the dead. The film also stars Theo Germaine, and was executive produced by Joe Swanberg.

Holy Trinity screened at the LGBTQ-oriented film festival Outfest in July 2019, as well as at the New York Lesbian, Gay, Bisexual, & Transgender Film Festival in October 2019.

Cast
 Molly Hewitt as Trinity, a dominatrix who develops the ability to communicate with the dead after huffing from a mysterious aerosol can.
 Theo Germaine as Baby, Trinity's partner, and a musician.
 Heather Lynn as Carol
 Imp Queen as Self (Imp Queen)

Reception

Beandrea July of The Hollywood Reporter criticized the film's dialogue but concluded that the film "celebrates living a sex- and kink-positive life and explores how an affirmative spirituality fits into that." Richard Roeper, writing for the Chicago Sun-Times, gave the film three out of four stars, commending Hewitt's performance and calling the film "An adventure sprinkled with quite a bit of kink." Michael Phillips of the Chicago Tribune gave the film two out of four stars, calling it "Bracingly sex-positive in all directions, if oddly flat as a performance vehicle".

The Chicago Readers Cody Corrall gave the film three out of four stars, writing that it "may not give everything it wants to cover the same amount of attention, but it leaves its audience with plenty to think about, from the politics of kink, to becoming a god and subordinating oneself interpersonally and within societal frameworks." Ben Sachs, also of the Chicago Reader, complimented the film's production design but noted that "Hewitt still has a ways to go in terms of storytelling; many of the scenes drag on past their welcome, and the overall pacing feels indifferent."

Jude Dry of IndieWire included Holy Trinity on their list of 2019 "LGBTQ Films Not to Be Missed".

References

External links
 
 

American comedy films
2019 films
2019 comedy films
2019 LGBT-related films
American LGBT-related films
LGBT-related black comedy films
LGBT-related comedy films
BDSM in films
2010s English-language films
2010s American films